Inkin is a Russian surname. Notable people with this surname include:

 Denis Inkin (born 1978), Russian boxer
 Geoffrey Inkin (1934–2013), British army officer

Russian-language surnames